Andrey Mazovka (16 June 1921 – 6 November 1967) was a Soviet sailor. He competed at the 1952 Summer Olympics and the 1956 Summer Olympics.

References

External links
 

1921 births
1967 deaths
Soviet male sailors (sport)
Olympic sailors of Belgium
Sailors at the 1952 Summer Olympics – Dragon
Sailors at the 1956 Summer Olympics – Dragon
Sportspeople from Saint Petersburg